Mount Macdonald is a mountain peak located in the Selkirk Mountains of British Columbia, Canada, immediately to the east of Rogers Pass in Glacier National Park.  It is notable as the location of the Canadian Pacific Railway's Connaught and Mount Macdonald Tunnels.  At 14.7 km, the Mount Macdonald tunnel is the longest railway tunnel in the western hemisphere.

The original name of the peak was Mount Carroll (for a member of the CPR engineering team under A. B. Rogers), but was renamed to honour the first Prime Minister of Canada, Sir John A. Macdonald by a Privy Council Order in Council #551 on 4 April 1887.


Climate

Based on the Köppen climate classification, this mountain is located in a subarctic climate zone with cold, snowy winters, and mild summers. Temperatures can drop below −20 °C with wind chill factors below −30 °C. Precipitation runoff from the mountain drains into tributaries of the Beaver River.

See also

 Mountain peaks of Canada
 Mountain peaks of North America

References

External links
 Weather: Mount Macdonald

Two-thousanders of British Columbia
Selkirk Mountains
Glacier National Park (Canada)
John A. Macdonald
Kootenay Land District